"Chocolate Salty Balls (P.S. I Love You)" is a song from the animated comedy TV series South Park, performed by the character Chef and featured on the soundtrack album Chef Aid: The South Park Album. The song's vocals are performed by Isaac Hayes, the voice actor for Chef. The song as it originally appeared was in the 1998 episode "Chef's Chocolate Salty Balls", in which Chef creates a confectionery treat, the eponymous Chocolate Salty Balls. He then begins to sing the lyrics that became the basis for the single.

The song was released as a single on December 14, 1998, and reached  1 on the UK Singles Chart and in Ireland. It also charted in mainland Europe and Australia, becoming a top-10 hit in Denmark, the Netherlands, and Norway while peaking at No. 14 in Australia. The song was written by South Park co-creator Trey Parker and produced by Rick Rubin.

Song information
The song's first and second verses feature Chef listing the ingredients for his "chocolate salty balls", an innuendo meaning testicles (even though the lyrics throughout refer to the edible food, as mentioned earlier). However, there is no mention of salt in the recipe. He also urges people to "suck on them" during the chorus. After listing the ingredients, he sings the lines, "Say, everybody, have you seen my balls / they're big and salty and brown / if you ever need a quick pick-me-up / just stick my balls in your mouth", starting the chorus.

During the song's final verse, Chef becomes concerned that his chocolate salty balls have become burned, and urges his lover to blow on them. In particular the lyrics he sings at that point are: "Hey... wait a minute... What's that smell? It smells like something's burnin'. Well, that don't confront me none, as long as I get my rent paid on Friday. Baby, you better get back in the kitchen... 'cause I've got a sneakin' suspicion. Oh, man baby... Baby! You just burned my balls!" The verse features a line from the song "One Bourbon, One Scotch, One Beer".

The radio version features an additional verse, in which Chef urges his lover to retire with him to his bedroom before her husband comes home but also omits the "hi I'm Chef" intro and most of the ending. This version is very hard to come by commercially but was included on the UK compilation album New Hits 99 CD1, Track 21.

The song was included on the fourth episode of series two of Cold Feet. Hayes also performed the song live at the 2002 Glastonbury Festival.

Chart performance
"Chocolate Salty Balls (P.S. I Love You)" reached No. 1 on the UK Singles Chart. The song was a contender for the Christmas No. 1 single in the UK but debuted at No. 2, behind the Spice Girls' "Goodbye", missing out on the top spot by 8,000 copies and garnering the most weekly sales for a song at No. 2 since Wham!'s "Last Christmas" in 1984. The following week, the track dethroned "Goodbye", giving Isaac Hayes his first and only number-one hit in the UK. The song became the seventh-best-selling single of 1998 in the UK. "Chocolate Salty Balls" was also a top-20 hit in Australia, peaking at No. 14 in February 1999.

Music video
The song's music video features various clips from season one and season two of South Park. It can be found on the South Park DVD South Park: The Chef Experience.

Track listings
European CD single
 "Chocolate Salty Balls (P.S. I Love You)" – 4:01
 "O Holy Night (Snippet)" (Eric Cartman feat. Kyle Broflovski and Mr. Garrison) – 2:00

European cassette single
 "Chocolate Salty Balls (P.S. I Love You)" – 3:55
 "Come Sail Away" (Eric Cartman) – 5:12

European and Australian CD maxi single
 "Chocolate Salty Balls (P.S. I Love You)" – 3:55
 "O Holy Night (Snippet)" (Eric Cartman feat. Kyle Broflovski and Mr. Garrison) – 2:21
 "Oh Little Town of Bethlehem" (Ned Gerblansky feat. Uncle Jimbo) – 0:58

UK maxi-CD single
 "Chocolate Salty Balls (P.S. I Love You)" – 3:55
 "Come Sail Away" (Eric Cartman) – 5:12
 "Mentally Dull (Think Thank Remix)" (Vitro) – 3:45

Personnel
 Bass – Eric Presley
 Drums – Matt Stone
 Engineer – David Schiffman
 Guitar – Bruce Howell
 Keyboards – Trey Parker
 Mixing – D. Sardy, Rick Rubin
 Percussion – Chris Trujillo
 Producer – Rick Rubin
 Vocals – Isaac Hayes
 Writing – Trey Parker

Charts

Weekly charts

Year-end charts

References

1998 singles
South Park songs
Fictional food and drink
Number-one singles in Scotland
UK Singles Chart number-one singles
Irish Singles Chart number-one singles
Animated music videos
Novelty songs
Funk songs
1998 songs
Songs from television series
Columbia Records singles
American Recordings (record label) singles